The Literaricum Lech is a literary conference in Lech am Arlberg in Vorarlberg (Austria). Its aim is to discuss classic as well as contemporary literature in a way that is accessible, innovative and diverting. It has premiered from 8 to 10 July 2021.

Organisation 
The Swiss-German cultural journalist Nicola Steiner is responsible for the organisation and conception of the Literaricum Lech. She is advised by the Vorarlberg writer Michael Köhlmeier, co-initiator of the Philosophicum Lech, as well as the equally renowned Austrian writer and literary scholar Raoul Schrott.

The Literaricum Lech will arrange classic literary discussions as well as children's and youth literature and poetry slams with the goal to provide a clear and accessible approach to literature.

It is intended that each edition of the Literaricum Lech has a classic piece of world literature put into focus. This classic can but doesn't have to be picked up on throughout the festival. In 2021, Daniel Kehlmann will give the opening speech on Simplicius Simplicissimus by the Baroque poet Hans Jakob Christoffel von Grimmelshausen.

The 2022 edition of the event is dedicated to Herman Melville.

See also 

 Medicinicum Lech
 Philosophicum Lech

References

External links 

 Official website (in German)

Recurring events established in 2021
Literary festivals in Europe
Culture of Vorarlberg